The Premio Roma is a Group 2 flat horse race in Italy open to thoroughbreds aged three years or older. It is run at Capannelle over a distance 2,000 metres (about 1¼ miles), and it is scheduled to take place each year in November.

History
The event was established in 1911, and it was originally contested over 2,700 metres. The inaugural running had prize money of 50,000 lire.

The race was shortened to 2,100 metres in 1913. It was extended to 2,200 metres in 1919, and increased to 2,800 metres in 1925.

The Premio Roma was given Group 1 status in the 1970s. It was cut to 2,000 metres in 1988. It was downgraded to Group 2 status in 2017.

Records
Most successful horse (2 wins):
 Pampino – 1933, 1934
 Grifone – 1947, 1949
 Surdi – 1961, 1962
 Bacuco – 1969, 1970

 Duke of Marmalade – 1975 (dead-heat), 1976
 Taipan – 1997, 1998
 Elle Danzig – 1999, 2000
 Soldier Hollow – 2004, 2005

Leading jockey (6 wins):
 Paolo Caprioli – Adelmo (1923), Old Master (1924), Ravioli (1925), Lui (1926), Vimarino (1932), Gaio (1939)

Leading trainer since 1974 (4 wins):
 John Dunlop – High Hawk (1983), Highland Chieftain (1989), Taipan (1997, 1998)

Leading owner (4 wins): (includes part ownership)
 Federico Tesio – Salvator Rosa (1912), Brunelleschi (1914), Nicophana (1935), Attalo (1938)
 Frank Turner – Apulejo (1915), Adelmo (1923), Old Master (1924), Ravioli (1925)
 Razza del Soldo – Vimarino (1932), Gaio (1939), Falerno (1954), Chitet (1957)
 Scuderia Mantova – Galea (1940), Piavola (1946), Carolina (1960), Astese (1966)

Winners since 1979

 The 1981 winner Dentz was later renamed Looking For.

Earlier winners
 1911: Dedalo
 1912: Salvator Rosa
 1913: Sigma
 1914: Brunelleschi
 1915: Apulejo
 1916: Aristippo
 1917: no race
 1918: Hollebeck
 1919: Alcione
 1920: Talaat Basa
 1921: Marcus
 1922: Pompea
 1923: Adelmo
 1924: Old Master
 1925: Ravioli
 1926: Lui
 1927: Paulo
 1928: Moltrasio
 1929: Tigliano
 1930: Emanuele Filiberto
 1931: Eucaliptolo
 1932: Vimarino

 1933: Pampino
 1934: Pampino
 1935: Nicophana
 1936: Ahmed
 1937: Sinni
 1938: Attalo
 1939: Gaio
 1940: Galea
 1941: Zuccarello
 1942–44: no race
 1945: Buonarrota
 1946: Piavola
 1947: Grifone
 1948: Eldorado
 1949: Grifone
 1950: Saccaroa
 1951: Bandinella
 1952: Worden
 1953: Neebisch
 1954: Falerno
 1955: Bewitched
 1956: Tissot

 1957: Chitet
 1958: Terma
 1959: Feria
 1960: Caorlina
 1961: Surdi
 1962: Surdi
 1963: Veronese
 1964: Haseltine
 1965: Demi Deuil
 1966: Astese
 1967: Carlos Primero
 1968: Chicago
 1969: Bacuco
 1970: Bacuco
 1971: Fidyi
 1972: Irvine
 1973: Sang Bleu
 1974: Orsa Maggiore
 1975: Duke of Marmalade / Henri le Balafre *
 1976: Duke of Marmalade
 1977: Montorselli
 1978: Nizon

* The 1975 race was a dead-heat and has joint winners.

See also
 List of Italian flat horse races

References

 Racing Post:
 capannelleippodromo.it – Albo d'Oro – Premio Roma.
 galopp-sieger.de – Premio Roma.
 horseracingintfed.com – International Federation of Horseracing Authorities – Premio Roma (2016).
 pedigreequery.com – Premio Roma – Roma Capannelle.

Horse races in Italy
Open middle distance horse races
Recurring sporting events established in 1911
Sports competitions in Rome